Hylyphantes graminicola is a small linyphiid spider with palaearctic distribution. It is one of the most important natural enemies of different pests in farmland and forests in Asia. In cotton fields, it was found to build a small web between clods of young plants, and to live on branches when the plant gets bigger. Up to 30 individuals per square meter were found in cotton fields of northern China.

Name
The species name graminicola is Latin for "dwelling in grass".

References

Linyphiidae
Spiders of Asia
Palearctic spiders
Spiders described in 1830